Miss Brunner is a fictional character in Michael Moorcock's Jerry Cornelius stories, and also appears in stories by other authors including M. John Harrison and Brian Aldiss. Unlike Cornelius and Una Persson, she is depicted as an authoritarian figure, a sado-masochistic techno-magician. As a result of her techno-magical experimentation, she is occasionally subject to demonic possession, particularly by the demon Belphegor. 

She is killed a number of times over the course of the various Jerry Cornelius stories written by Moorcock and others, often by Jerry himself. Nevertheless, her interests and those of Cornelius often intersect—though her final goals are usually incompatible with his.

She was played by Jenny Runacre in the movie The Final Programme (loosely based on Moorcock's novel of the same name), at the end of which Miss Brunner and Cornelius are physically merged into a single hermaphroditic being.

Michael Moorcock characters